The term self-immolation broadly refers to acts of altruistic suicide, otherwise the giving up of one's body in an act of sacrifice. However, it most often refers specifically to autocremation, the act of sacrificing oneself by setting oneself on fire and burning to death. It is typically used for political or religious reasons, often as a form of non-violent protest or in acts of martyrdom. It has a centuries-long recognition as the most extreme form of protest possible by humankind.

Etymology
The English word immolation originally meant (1534) "killing a sacrificial victim; sacrifice" and came to figuratively mean (1690) "destruction, especially by fire". Its etymology was from Latin  "to sprinkle with sacrificial meal (mola salsa); to sacrifice" in ancient Roman religion.

Self-immolation was first recorded in Lady Morgan's France (1817).

Effects
Self-immolators frequently use accelerants before igniting themselves. This, combined with the self-immolators' refusal to protect themselves, can produce hotter flames and deeper, more extensive burns.
Self-immolation has been described as excruciatingly painful. Later the burns become severe, nerves are burnt and the self-immolator loses sensation at the burnt areas. Some self-immolators can die during the act from inhalation of toxic combustion products, hot air and flames.  
The body has an inflammatory response to burnt skin which happens after 25% is burnt in adults. This response leads to blood and body fluid loss. If the self-immolator is not taken to a burn centre in less than four hours, they are more likely to die from shock. If no more than 80% of their body area is burnt and the self-immolator is younger than 40 years old, there is a survival chance of 50%. If the self-immolator has over 80% burns, the survival rate drops to 20%.

History

Self-immolation is tolerated by some elements of Mahayana Buddhism and Hinduism, and it has been practiced for many centuries, especially in India, for various reasons, including jauhar, political protest, devotion, and renouncement. An example from mythology includes the practice of Sati when the Hindu goddess Parvati's incarnation of the same name (see also Daksayani) legendarily set herself on fire after her father insulted her in Daksha Yajna for having married Shiva, the ascetic god. Shiva, Parvati and their army of ghosts attacked Daksha's Yajna and destroyed the sacrifice and Shiva beheaded Daksha and killed Daksha. Later, Daksha was revived by him and Daksha Yajna was completed when Daksha apologized. Certain warrior cultures, such as those of the Charans and Rajputs, also practiced self-immolation.

Zarmanochegas was a monk of the Sramana tradition (possibly, but not necessarily a Buddhist) who, according to ancient historians such as Strabo and Dio Cassius, met Nicholas of Damascus in Antioch around 22 BC and burnt himself to death in Athens shortly thereafter.

The monk Fayu 法羽 (d. 396) carried out the earliest recorded Chinese self-immolation. He first informed the "illegitimate" prince Yao Xu 姚緒—brother of Yao Chang who founded the non-Chinese Qiang state Later Qin (384–417)—that he intended to burn himself alive. Yao tried to dissuade Fayu, but he publicly swallowed incense chips, wrapped his body in oiled cloth, and chanted while setting fire to himself. The religious and lay witnesses were described as being "full of grief and admiration".

Following Fayu's example, many Buddhist monks and nuns have used self-immolation for political purposes. Based upon analysis of Chinese historical records from the 4th to the 20th centuries, some monks did offer their bodies in periods of relative prosperity and peace, but there is a "marked coincidence" between acts of self-immolation and times of crisis, especially when secular powers were hostile towards Buddhism. For example, Daoxuan's (c. 667) Xu Gaoseng Zhuan (續高僧傳, or Continued Biographies of Eminent Monks) records five monastics who self-immolated on the Zhongnan Mountains in response to the 574–577 persecution of Buddhism by Emperor Wu of Northern Zhou (known as the "Second Disaster of Wu").

For many monks and laypeople in Chinese history, self-immolation was a form of Buddhist practice that modeled and expressed a particular path that led towards Buddhahood.

Historian Jimmy Yu has stated that self-immolation cannot be interpreted based on Buddhist doctrine and beliefs alone but the practice must be understood in the larger context of the Chinese religious landscape. He examines many primary sources from the 16th and 17th century and demonstrates that bodily practices of self-harm, including self-immolation, was ritually performed not only by Buddhists but also by Daoists and literati officials who either exposed their naked body to the sun in a prolonged period of time as a form of self-sacrifice or burned themselves as a method of procuring rain. In other words, self-immolation was a sanctioned part of Chinese culture that was public, scripted, and intelligible both to the person doing the act and to those who viewed and interpreted it, regardless of their various religion affiliations.

During the Great Schism of the Russian Church, entire villages of Old Believers burned themselves to death in an act known as "fire baptism" (self-burners: sozhigateli). Scattered instances of self-immolation have also been recorded by the Jesuit priests of France in the early 17th century. However, their practice of this was not intended to be fatal: they would burn certain parts of their bodies (limbs such as the forearm or the thigh) to symbolise the pain Jesus endured while upon the cross. A 1973 study by a prison doctor suggested that people who choose self-immolation as a form of suicide are more likely to be in a "disturbed state of consciousness", such as epilepsy.

Political protest 
As a form of political protest, the 14th Dalai Lama explained in 2013 and 2015 the act of self-immolation:

Self-immolations are often public and political statements that are often reported by the news media. They can be seen by others as a type of altruistic suicide for a collective cause, and are not intended to inflict physical harm on others or cause material damage. They attract attention to a specific cause and those who undergo the act may be seen as martyrs. Self-immolation does not guarantee death for the burned; self-immolation survivors suffer from severe disfigurements from resulting burns.

Vietnam 

The Buddhist crisis in South Vietnam saw the persecution of the country's majority religion under the administration of Catholic president Ngô Đình Diệm. Several Buddhist monks, including the most famous case of Thích Quảng Đức, immolated themselves in protest.

The example set by self-immolators in the mid 20th century did spark numerous similar acts between 1963 and 1971, most of which occurred in Asia and the United States in conjunction with protests opposing the Vietnam War. Researchers counted almost 100 self-immolations covered by The New York Times and The Times.

Soviet Bloc 
In 1968, the practice spread to the Soviet bloc with the self-immolation of Polish accountant and Armia Krajowa veteran Ryszard Siwiec, as well as those of two Czech students, Jan Palach and Jan Zajíc, and of toolmaker Evžen Plocek, in protest against the Warsaw Pact invasion of Czechoslovakia. As a protest against Soviet rule in Lithuania, 19-year-old Romas Kalanta set himself on fire in Kaunas in 1972. In 1978, Ukrainian dissident and former political prisoner Oleksa Hirnyk burnt himself near the tomb of the Ukrainian poet Taras Shevchenko protesting against the russification of Ukraine under Soviet rule. On 2 March 1989, Liviu Cornel Babeș set himself on fire on the Bradu ski slope at Poiana Brașov as a sign of protest against the communist regime. He left the message: "Stop Mörder! Brașov = Auschwitz." He was taken to the Brașov county hospital, where he died two hours later.

Russian Federation 
In 2020, the practice resumed when Russian journalist Irina Slavina burned herself in Nizhny Novgorod after her last post on Facebook, in which she wrote: "I ask you to blame the Russian Federation for my death".
Also, cases of self-immolation as a form of political protest were recorded in Moscow, St. Petersburg, Ufa, Izhevsk, Kemerovo and other cities of the Russian Federation. Most of the cases were fatal.

India 
The practice continues, notably in India: as many as 1,451 and 1,584 self-immolations were reported there in 2000 and 2001, respectively. A particularly high wave of self-immolation in India was recorded in 1990 protesting the system of Reservation. Tamil Nadu has the highest number of self-immolations in India to date.

Iran 
In Iran, most self-immolations have been performed by citizens protesting the tempestuous changes brought upon after the Iranian Revolution. Many of these instances have gone largely unreported by regime authority, but have been discussed and documented by established witnesses. Provinces that were involved more intensively in postwar problems feature higher rates of self-immolation. These undocumented demonstrations of protest are deliberated upon worldwide, by professionals such as Iranian historians who appear on international broadcasts such as Voice of America, and use the immolations as propaganda to direct criticism towards the Censorship in Iran. One specifically well documented self-immolation transpired in 1993, 14 years after the revolution, and was performed by Homa Darabi, a self-proclaimed political activist affiliated with the Nation Party of Iran. Darabi is known for her political self-immolation in protest to the compulsory hijab. Self-immolation protests continue to take place against the regime to this day. Most recently accounted for is the September 2019 death of Sahar Khodayari, protesting a possible sentence of six months in prison for having tried to enter a public stadium to watch a football game, against the national ban against women at such events. One month after her death, Iranian women were allowed to attend a football match in Iran for the first time in 40 years. On 27 December 2022, a 38-year-old student, Mohammad Moradi, drowned himself in the Rhône in Lyon, France to draw more attention to the anti-government Mahsa Amini protests.

People's Republic of China 

In 2009, the monk Tapey at Kirti Monastery in Amdo self-immolated in protest of the Chinese Government's restrictions placed against an important ceremony.
A wave of self-immolations began in 2011, after another monk, Phuntsok, also from Kirti Monastery self-immolated. The wave continued until 2019 and resumed again in 2022. As of April 2022, there were 161 confirmed events in Tibet and 10 others made in solidarity outside of Tibet. With the self-immolations by Tibetans, most of these protests (some 80%) end in death, while eyewitness reports state many of the protestors have been shot and beaten while burning, and then arrested by Chinese authorities, before disappearing.

The 14th Dalai Lama has spoken with respect and compassion for those who engage in self-immolation, and blamed the self-immolations on "cultural genocide" by the Chinese. The Chinese government claims that he and the exiled Tibetan government are inciting these acts. In 2013, the Dalai Lama questioned the effectiveness of self-immolation as a demonstration tactic. He has also expressed that the Tibetans are acting of their own free will and stated that he cannot influence them to stop carrying out immolation as a form of protest.

Arab Spring 
A wave of self-immolation suicides occurred in conjunction with the Arab Spring protests in the Middle East and North Africa, with at least 14 recorded incidents. These suicides assisted in inciting the Arab Spring, including the 2010–2011 Tunisian revolution, the main catalyst of which was the self-immolation of Mohamed Bouazizi, the 2011 Algerian protests (including many self-immolations in Algeria), and the 2011 Egyptian revolution. There have also been suicide protests in Saudi Arabia, Mauritania, and Syria.

Taiwan 
On 3 December 2020, a Taiwanese man self-immolated to protest closure of CTi News.

Australia 
On 1 January 2022, an Australian man self-immolated to protest the COVID-19 vaccine mandates and vaccine IDs. He was later taken to the hospital.

On 17 January 2023, a body is found on fire in a vacant lot on a suburban Brisbane street, with police claiming it to be an act of self-harm.

United States 
On 14 April 2018, David Buckel self immolated in Prospect Park in Brooklyn. Shortly before lighting himself on fire he sent an email to several news outlets which included the statement "Most humans on the planet now breathe air made unhealthy by fossil fuels, and many die early deaths as a result—my early death by fossil fuel reflects what we are doing to ourselves."

Wynn Bruce, a climate activist from Boulder, Colorado self-immolated on the steps of the Supreme Court of the United States on Earth Day, 22 April 2022. On 28 March 2022, he made a Facebook post stating “This is not humor. It is all about breathing” followed by “Clean air matters.”

Japan 
In 2014, two men set themselves on fire in protest at Japan's shift away from postwar pacifism.

On 21 September 2022, a man believed to be in his 70s set himself on fire near the Japanese prime minister's office (Kantei). The man was expressing his disapproval for the planned state funeral for former prime minister Shinzo Abe.

Turkey  
On January 13, 2018, a 38-year-old man burned himself in front of the Grand National Assembly of Turkey in Ankara, stating that he had been jobless for 5 years, and asked for help from the government.

See also 
 List of political self-immolations
 Self-immolations in Tunisia
 Self-immolation protests by Tibetans in China
 Tsewang Norbu

References

Bibliography 
 King, Sallie B. (2000). They Who Burned Themselves for Peace: Quaker and Buddhist Self-Immolators during the Vietnam War, Buddhist-Christian Studies 20, 127–150  
 Kovan, Martin (2013). Thresholds of Transcendence: Buddhist Self-immolation and Mahāyānist Absolute Altruism, Part One. Journal of Buddhist Ethiks 20, 775–812
 Kovan, Martin (2014). Thresholds of Transcendence: Buddhist Self-immolation and Mahāyānist Absolute Altruism, Part Two. Journal of Buddhist Ethiks 21, 384–430
 Patler, Nicholas. Norman's Triumph: the Transcendent Language of Self-Immolation Quaker History, Fall 2015,18–39.

External links 

 "The Self Immolators". A chronological list (free pdf book form) containing the biographies and last statements of all known self immolators since Thich Quang Duc in 1963

Fire in culture
Protest tactics
Religious rituals
Suicide methods
 
Human sacrifice
Traditions involving fire